Ballakilpheric (meaning "settlement of St Patrick's church") is a small village in the parish of Rushen (recently amalgamated with Arbory for administrative purposes) in the southwest of the Isle of Man,  northwest of the larger village of Colby, and  by road northeast of Port Erin. It is the main settlement on the B44 road. The small Colby River flows to the east of the village, and forms the boundary with Arbory parish. Ballakilpheric Methodist Chapel lies at the top of the hill.

History
There were several Neolithic stones in the vicinity. An Early Bronze Age flat axehead was unearthed in a field near Ballakelly Cottage in the village in 1975; it is currently part of the Manx National Heritage Collection. An archaeological find of early medieval artifacts in the area is known as the Ballakilpheric hoard.

Landmarks
Ballakilpheric Methodist Chapel is situated at the top of a hill. There is a large white house called Burn Brae, past Ballakilpheric Farm,  and another large house called Belle Abbey House.

Culture
A traditional harvest festival is held at Ballakilpheric Methodist Chapel in September. The Manx Gaelic language singing group Caarjyn Cooidjagh released a CD entitled Ballakilpheric. The album features traditional songs from the Isle of Man.

References 

Villages in the Isle of Man